Aleurodicus rugioperculatus (known variously as the rugose spiraling whitefly, the gumbo limbo spiraling whitefly or just the spiraling whitefly) is a species of whitefly found throughout the Florida Keys. This insect was first described by Jon H. Martin in 2004.

References 

Whiteflies
Hemiptera of North America
Insects described in 2004